This is a list of characters in Kaizoku Sentai Gokaiger, the 35th entry in the Super Sentai franchise. The series centers on a group of space pirates called the Gokaigers and their quest to find the Greatest Treasure in the Universe. Along the way, they encounter the Zangyack Empire, who have placed bounties on their heads, and members of past Super Sentai, whose powers the Gokaigers collected prior to their arrival on Earth.

Main characters

Gokaigers
The  are a group of young space pirates who seek the Greatest Treasure in the Universe, which leads them to Earth. However, on their journey, they cross paths with the evil Space Empire Zangyack, who conquered their planets long ago and placed bounties on their heads, and indirectly interfere in their invasion of Earth. While originally acting out of personal interest, the Gokaigers' encounters with past Sentai heroes, experience on Earth, and Gai Ikari's participation in the team result in the core five embracing their predecessors' role as protectors of Earth and its inhabitants.

Each member of the Gokaigers has a bounty on their heads placed on them by the Zangyack Empire for opposing their invasion. At the beginning of the series, the Gokaigers' initial bounty collectively started at 3,100,100, with the empire merely shrugging off their activities. As the series goes on, the Gokaigers' constant interference leads to Zangyack steadily increasing the bounty until the pirates kill Warz Gill, the Zangyack emperor's son. As a result, the Zangyack Empire brings their bounties to an "Unlimited Reward" for Captain Marvelous, a collective total of 15,600,050 for the rest of the crew, and marks all of them as "kill on sight" while the Gokaigers themselves decide to take the fight to the Zangyack. After the death of Akudos Gill and the fall of the Zangyack Empire, Marvelous returns the Ranger Keys and their Great Powers to their respective Sentai warriors before he and his crew depart the Earth, going on a journey to the Zangyack homeworld to find what he presumes to be the second Greatest Treasure.

During the events of the crossover film Tokumei Sentai Go-Busters vs. Kaizoku Sentai Gokaiger: The Movie however, the Gokai Galleon crew find themselves overwhelmed by the Zangyack's new acting leader Bacchus Gill and feigned surrender to use him to obtain the treasure he sought after. After helping the Go-Busters defeat Bacchus, the Gokaigers leave Earth in the newest Sentai team's hands while they resume looking for treasure throughout the cosmos.

The Gokaigers utilize the  cellphone and Ranger Keys in order to transform as well as summon their Gokai Machines. They can also summon additional Ranger Keys based on their Sentai predecessors from their , which is linked to the Gokai Treanger Box.

As of succeeding Sentai series Doubutsu Sentai Zyuohger, in which the Gokaigers make a guest appearance as part of the 40th Super Sentai anniversary event, they can now assume the form of their Sentai successors up to the Ninningers. As of the web series Twokaizer × Gokaiger: The Tanuki-Charmed June Bride, they gain access to Ranger Keys from all Sentai up to the Zenkaigers.

Captain Marvelous
 is the young captain of the Gokaigers whose turn to piracy started after losing his home planet to the Zangyack Empire at a young age and joining the  following an encounter with Aka Red. When the crew was wiped out after being betrayed by Basco ta Jolokia, Marvelous decides to honor his leader's wish by continuing their search for the Greatest Treasure in the Universe, eventually forming his own crew of space pirates whose members also share his ideal. Despite his recklessness earning the ire of his crew, Marvelous is willing to use his authority to save them and/or civilians, even if it means risking his own life. Following the death of Akudos Gill, Marvelous joins Zangyack on two separate occasions after the end of Kaizoku Sentai Gokaiger; first in the crossover film Kamen Rider × Super Sentai: Super Hero Taisen as part of a collaboration with Tsukasa Kadoya to stop the Dai Zangyack/Dai Shocker alliance, and second in Tokumei Sentai Go-Busters vs. Kaizoku Sentai Gokaiger: The Movie alongside his crew as part of a ploy to prevent Bacchus Gill from abusing the phantom Ranger Keys' power.

During the events of Super Sentai Strongest Battle, Marvelous joins the titular tournament as a member of the Oddball Team with Yamato Kazakiri, Takaharu Igasaki, Stinger, and Kagura Izumi while pursuing his own agenda in tracking down Gaisoulg for attacking his crew prior to the tournament. During the events of Kaizoku Sentai: Ten Gokaiger, Marvelous enters a tournament held by the Bakut Pirates to foil their plan to conquer the universe with the Ranger Keys and reunites with his crew after they disbanded years prior.

On his own, Marvelous possesses brute strength that surpasses normal humans, having achieved this by playing darts with weighted bracelets. As , Marvelous focuses on both ranged and close combat styles through dual-wielding of the Gokai Saber and Gun. With Gavan, Marvelous can perform the  Final Wave.

Gold Mode: A form accessed via Gai Ikari's Gokai Cellular and Gold Anchor Key that grants Marvelous the powers of past sixth Rangers and Gokai Silver's Gokai Spear in Anchor Mode. This form first appears in the video game Super Sentai Battle: Dice-O before making canonical appearances in the Hyper Battle DVD special Kaizoku Sentai Gokaiger: Let's Do This Goldenly! Roughly! 36 Round Gokai Change!! and Super Sentai Strongest Battle.
: An armament accessed from the Gokai Galleon Key that grants a breastplate based on the Gokai Galleon. This form appears exclusively in Kaizoku Sentai: Ten Gokaiger.
: A stronger variant form based on GokaiOh accessed from combining his Cross Armor with those of the other four Gokaigers'.

Joe Gibken
 is the loyal first mate of Captain Marvelous and the first to be recruited into the Gokaigers. Originally a member of Zangyack's Imperial Special Forces, Gibken was imprisoned after refusing to kill a group of captive children and escaped after his mentor Sid Bamick sacrificed himself to delay his pursuers. While on the run, Marvelous freed Gibken from his tracking collar and the latter had since sworn loyalty to the former as a form of life debt. By the time the Gokaigers arrive on Earth and battle the Zangyack invasion forces, Gibken finds himself in a dilemma after discovering his mentor had been brainwashed and converted into Barizorg until he receives encouragement from Joh Ohara and remembers the times he spent with the Gokaigers, allowing Gibken to put his hesitations to rest, give his former friend a mercy kill to end his suffering, and finally come to terms with his past.

Since his early days as a Zangyack officer, Gibken received swordsmanship training from Bamick and gradually hones his skill outside of the battle against the Zangyack Empire. As , Gibken makes use of a dual-wielding swordsmanship style by using his Gokai Saber in addition to another bladed weapon, usually either a spare Gokai Saber from his crew or a bladed weapon taken from an enemy or another Super Sentai warrior. He can also utilize all of his teammates' Gokai Sabers at once to perform the  Final Wave. Similarly, to Barizorg, Gibken can perform his own version of Bamick's Ittō-ryū Soul Blade attack.

In Kaizoku Sentai: Ten Gokaiger, through the Gokai Galleon Key, Gibken can transform into Cross Armor Mode, gaining the use of a quintuple-bladed, claw-like weapon on his right arm.

Luka Millfy
 is a tomboy who serves as the crew's lookout. Originating from a planet under Zangyack's control, the homeless Millfy and her friend Cain took care of orphans until her little sister, Lia's, death convinced her to leave their planet to secure funds for improving the children's livelihood. While making ends meet as a thief, Millfy came across Captain Marvelous and Joe Gibken, who saved her during a failed heist, and offer Millfy the position of their reconnaissance and infiltration expert. During her time as a Gokaiger, she acquired a collection of expensive jewelry, which her teammates exploit to pawn off for local currency, much to her dismay. Despite her intense greed for treasures, she still cares for her teammates, especially Ahim de Famille, whom Millfy treats as a surrogate little sister.

Having frequently trained her eyes since childhood, Millfy has developed acute reflexes in combat, which she uses to make up for her relative lack of physical strength. Her training also enables her to spot nearby treasure and distinguish fake gems from real ones. As , Millfy fights by dual-wielding Gokai Sabers, which she can either combine into a double-bladed weapon or use as a pair of extendable whips.

In Kaizoku Sentai: Ten Gokaiger, through the Gokai Galleon Key, Millfy can transform into Cross Armor Mode, gaining the use of a quadruple blade launcher on her left leg.

Don Dogoier
, nicknamed , is the cheerful and honest ship mechanic, cook, and caretaker whose seemingly spineless attitude actually hides his true courage, which he shows when his friends are in danger. Prior to the series, Dogoier was a repairman who Captain Marvelous, Joe Gibken, and Luka Millfy sought out for help in fixing the Gokai Galleon. Impressed with Dogoier's skills in gadgetry, cleaning, and cooking, Marvelous had the repairman shanghaied into his crew ever since. Despite being a coward even after receiving the mantle of a Gokaiger, the Gokaigers' adventures on Earth have made Dogoier more confident in himself and able to support his teammates more effectively, to the point where he volunteered to develop a new weapon for the team. Due to his background, he was originally dismissed by Zangyack as a lesser threat and assigned him the lowest bounty until his participation in freeing Marvelous from a Zangyack execution and killing lead member Damaras forces Zangyack to treat him as a threat on par with his crewmates.

Due to having little to no martial prowess, Dogoier relies heavily on stealth, trickery, and using the environment around him to improvise attacks, with his clumsiness in battle often ending up looking like he is doing comic slapstick. As , Dogoier often uses a pair of Gokai Guns since his lack of proper combat training resulted in his preference for long-ranged combat until an encounter with Jyan Kandou convinces the former to consider training his physicality in subsequent battles.

In Kaizoku Sentai: Ten Gokaiger, through the Gokai Galleon Key, Dogoier can transform into Cross Armor Mode, gaining the use of a double-barreled gun on his left arm.

Ahim de Famille
 is a gentle and well-mannered lady as well as the fourth member to join the Gokaigers. She was the princess of the planet Famille before Zatsurig of the Zangyack Imperial Guard destroyed her homeworld and killed her parents for not accepting annexation into the Zangyack Empire as threatened to. While on the run, she came across the Gokaigers by chance and asked to join them so that she can fight the Zangyack forces and inspire hope to other survivors from her home world and any other planet that the Zangyack destroyed. Unlike most of her more trigger-happy and rude teammates or the otherwise spineless Dogoier, Famille usually tries to solve conflicts peacefully. Owing to her royal upbringing, she is also unusually courteous, not only making her the crew's diplomat, but also capable of easing any tension among her teammates, who constantly bickered among themselves before she arrived due to their rougher personalities. She is also the most fascinated with many aspects of common Earth culture as, being raised as royalty, she has very little understanding of life outside of her high society lifestyle. Amidst their battles with Zangyack, Famille and her crewmates would eventually encounter Zatsurig and kill him in battle, avenging her family and homeworld.

During her early days with the Gokaigers, she was practically useless as a pirate due to having no unique utilitarian abilities, zero martial prowess, a tendency for constantly making a mess out of chores with her clumsiness, and being very slow to catch up to anything. By the time the pirates arrive on Earth however, she has since become a competent pirate and fully capable of holding her own in battle. As , she adopted Dogoier's dual-wielding of Gokai Guns. In the crossover film Gokaiger Goseiger Super Sentai 199 Hero Great Battle, Famille can perform the  alongside Super Gosei Pink.

In Kaizoku Sentai: Ten Gokaiger, through the Gokai Galleon Key, Famille can transform into Cross Armor Mode, gaining the use of a quadruple cannon on her right leg.

Gai Ikari
 is the only Earthling of the group and a Super Sentai fan who was injured while saving a little girl from being hit by a truck. While recovering in the hospital, Ikari was visited in his dreams by the ghosts of Mikoto Nakadai, Time Fire, and Dragon Ranger, who gave him the ability to become  and access to their respective teams' Great Powers. Despite being denied membership into the Gokaigers by Captain Marvelous, who did not believe Ikari offered anything unique to the group nor understood the gravity of their situation with the Zangyack Empire, Ikari's enthusiasm and bravery convince the Gokaigers to let him join them.

With the other Gokaigers, he can perform the  Final Wave. Additionally, Ikari can assume the following forms:

Go-On Wings: A hybrid form based on Go-On Gold and Silver that arms Ikari with two Rocket Daggers.
: An armored form accessed from the Gold Anchor Key that grants increased offense and defensive capabilities at the cost of reduced speed and agility.
: A special form accessed from the Gokai Christmas Key that arms Ikari with one Gokai Sword and Gun, which allow him to perform the  Final Wave.

Ranger Keys
The  are mysterious items that were originally scattered across the cosmos after the 34 previous Super Sentai sacrificed their powers to defeat the Zangyack Empire's first invasion wave until the Red Pirates gathered them all. Aka Red gave them to Marvelous for safekeeping and so he can use their full potential to find the Greatest Treasure. The Keys allow the Gokaigers to transform, activate their weapons' finishers, and access a previous Sentai team's powers.

While the Gokaigers usually transform into a Sentai hero of their corresponding color and have primary personal Ranger Keys, the items are not specific to any of them. Additionally, they can also use a Ranger Key of any color and/or the closest analogue. If the gender of the original hero is different, the Gokaiger's transformed suit will match the corresponding style used for the original team.

In the film Gokaiger Goseiger Super Sentai 199 Hero Great Battle and later in the series, it is revealed that past Sentai warriors are able to regain their powers by claiming their respective Ranger Key. They can also infuse them with their team's Great Power, at the cost of their powers. However, deceased Sentai warriors such as Mikoto Nakadai of the Abarangers and Gai Yuki of the Jetmen still possess their powers.

During the events of the crossover films Kamen Rider × Super Sentai: Super Hero Taisen and Kamen Rider × Super Sentai × Space Sheriff: Super Hero Taisen Z, the Gokaigers gain Ranger Keys based on Kamen Rider OOO and six Metal Heroes respectively.

After joining forces with the Go-Busters, the Phantom Keys transform into Buddyloid Keys, which grant the Gokaigers and Go-Busters the use of  so they can transform their mecha into those of past Sentai groups.

Gokai Machines
The  are the Gokaigers' personal giant vehicles, each of which are normally stored within the Gokai Galleon in a fashion similar to a Matryoshka doll, with Gokai Trailer as the second largest mecha, the third being Gokai Marine, fourth is Gokai Racer and Gokai Jet being the fifth.
 : Gokai Red's three-masted galleon-like spacecraft that was originally Aka Red's vessel before it became the Gokaigers' base of operations. As of Kaizoku Sentai: Ten Gokaiger, the Gokai Galleon was destroyed, but the Gokaigers use its remains to create the Gokai Galleon Key.
 : Gokai Blue's jet-like Gokai Machine that is armed with a series of beam and vulcan cannons as well as a powerful energy cannon.
 : Gokai Yellow's semi-trailer truck-like Gokai Machine that offers incredible ramming power.
 : Gokai Green's race car-like Gokai Machine that is armed with a beam and energy cannon.
 : Gokai Pink's submarine-like Gokai Machine that is armed with a beam cannon, tracking torpedoes, and homing mines.

Great Powers
The  are varying special powers based on the Gokaigers' Sentai predecessors, which they gain by earning past Sentai heroes' approval. While all of the Great Powers are summoned through the corresponding team's set of Ranger Keys, many of them manifest as mecha that can combine with that of the Gokaigers', GokaiOh, though some allow it or the Gokaigers themselves to perform unique attacks.

Mahō Sentai Magiranger: The  is a red dragon-like mecha based on that of the Magirangers.
Tokusou Sentai Dekaranger: The  is a police car-like mecha based on the Dekarangers' leader, Deka Red's, Deka Machine. Unlike the original Pat Striker, the Gokaigers' version is armed with guns and Gatling guns on its wheels.
Juken Sentai Gekiranger: The  are qi-based projections of the totem animals of the Gekirangers' fighting styles. When channeled through GokaiOh, the Great Power allows the mecha to perform the  finisher.
Hyakujuu Sentai Gaoranger:  is the totem Power Animal of the Gaorangers' leader, Gao Red. Gao Lion initially fights both the Gokaigers and Zangyack until it sees the former fight for altruistic reasons and allows them to summon it to fight alongside them.
Samurai Sentai Shinkenger:  is the Shinkengers' elemental kanji-based source of power.
Gekisou Sentai Carranger: The Carrangers' team pose is what they perform after reciting their roll call. When channeled through GokaiOh, the Great Power allows the mecha to perform the  finisher.
Himitsu Sentai Gorenger: The  is the Gorengers' bulldog-like flying fortress and base of operations. The Gokaigers acquire this Great Power during the events of the film Gokaiger Goseiger Super Sentai 199 Hero Great Battle.
J.A.K.Q. Dengekitai: An unseen Great Power that the Gokaigers acquired during the events of the film Gokaiger Goseiger Super Sentai 199 Hero Great Battle.
Denshi Sentai Denziman: An unseen Great Power that the Gokaigers acquired during the events of the film Gokaiger Goseiger Super Sentai 199 Hero Great Battle. In the film Kaizoku Sentai Gokaiger vs. Space Sheriff Gavan: The Movie, the Gokaigers use the Denzimen's Great Power in conjunction with that of the Battle Fever team's to open a portal to Makuu Space.
Dai Sentai Goggle-V: An unseen Great Power that the Gokaigers acquired during the events of the film Gokaiger Goseiger Super Sentai 199 Hero Great Battle.
Kagaku Sentai Dynaman: The  is the Dynamen's signature finisher. After acquiring this Great Power during the events of the film Gokaiger Goseiger Super Sentai 199 Hero Great Battle, the Gokaigers gain the ability to perform the Dynamen's  finisher. When channeled through GokaiOh, the Great Power allows the mecha to perform the  finisher.
Choudenshi Bioman:  An unseen Great Power that the Gokaigers acquired during the events of the film Gokaiger Goseiger Super Sentai 199 Hero Great Battle.
Kousoku Sentai Turboranger:  An unseen Great Power that the Gokaigers acquired during the events of the film Gokaiger Goseiger Super Sentai 199 Hero Great Battle.
Gosei Sentai Dairanger:  is the Dairangers' main power source. When channeled through GokaiOh and GouZyuJin, the Great Power allows the mecha to perform the  finisher. The Gokaigers acquire this Great Power during the events of the film Gokaiger Goseiger Super Sentai 199 Hero Great Battle.
The Gokaigers acquire this Great Power during the events of in the film Gokaiger Goseiger Super Sentai 199 Hero Great Battle.
Tensou Sentai Goseiger: The  are the Goseigers' living head-like items. When channeled through GokaiOh, the Great Power allows the mecha to perform the  finisher. The Gokaigers acquire this Great Power during the events of in the film Gokaiger Goseiger Super Sentai 199 Hero Great Battle.
Bakuryū Sentai Abaranger: Gai Ikari's personal mecha, GouZyuJin, which resembles that of the Abarangers', AbarenOh. When channeled through GouZyuJin, the Great Power allows it to perform the  finisher.
Mirai Sentai Timeranger: GouZyuJin's alternate mode, GouZyu Drill, which resembles the Timerangers' Time Jet and can travel through time.
Kyōryū Sentai Zyuranger: GouZyuJin's alternate mode, GouZyu Rex, which resembles the Zyurangers' Guardian Beast Tyrannosaurus.
Seijuu Sentai Gingaman: An unseen Great Power that, when channeled through GouZyuJin, allows it to perform the  finisher.
Kyuukyuu Sentai GoGoFive: Five large  based on the Chemical Extinguishers used by the GoGoFive team's mecha, Victory Robo. When channeled through GokaiOh, the Great Power allows the mecha to perform the  attack and the  finisher.
Ninpuu Sentai Hurricaneger:  is a sentient ninja-like mecha who facilitated the combination of the Hurricangers and Gouraigers' mecha, Gourai Senpuujin. Redesigned to resemble Shurikenger's mecha, Tenkuujin, Fuuraimaru rides on a large shuriken and can perform the  attack and the  finisher. Fuuraimaru initially appears on his own before the Gokaigers gain the Hurricanegers' blessing and Fuuraimaru's partnership.
Chōjin Sentai Jetman: The will to overcome any obstacle, including death, represented by the Jetmen's  attack. After acquiring this Great Power, the Gokaigers gain the ability to perform it themselves. When channeled through GokaiOh, the Great Power allows the mecha to perform the  finisher.
Choujyu Sentai Liveman:  is the combination of the Livemen's mecha, Live Robo and Live Boxer.
Engine Sentai Go-onger:  is an inhabitant of Machine World and the son of two of the Go-ongers' Engine partners, Speedor and BearRV, who resembles a Formula One car and a falcon. In battle, he is capable of firing energy blasts from his tail pipes and fly via . Due to his absentee parents, Machalcon became a reckless troublemaker who prefers racing over anything else until the Gokaigers realize this and allow him to join them so he can find his purpose. While the Gokaigers originally obtained the ability to summon Machalcon from Saki Rōyama during the events of Gokaiger Goseiger Super Sentai 199 Hero Great Battle, an encounter with Sōsuke Esumi leads the pirates to realize the Go-ongers' true Great Power is the bond between them and Machalcon.
Denji Sentai Megaranger: The  is a component of Mega Silver's personal jet-like mecha, Mega Winger.
Battle Fever J: An unseen Great Power that the Gokaigers acquired from Battle Fever team member, Shiro Akebono, as a Christmas present. In the film Kaizoku Sentai Gokaiger vs. Space Sheriff Gavan: The Movie, the Gokaigers use the Battle Fever team's Great Power in conjunction with that of the Denzimen's to open a portal to Makuu Space.
Ninja Sentai Kakuranger:  is an ally of the Kakurangers who was sealed in a pot for ten years following the events of his series until the Gokaigers free him in the present. Ninjaman is voiced by Kazuki Yao, who reprises his role from Ninja Sentai Kakuranger.
Dengeki Sentai Changeman: The  is the Changemen's mysterious power source. Basco Ta Jolokia originally stole this Great Power until the Gokaigers defeat him. When channeled through GokaiOh, the Great Power allows the mecha to perform the  finisher.
Choushinsei Flashman: An unseen Great Power that Jolokia originally stole off-screen until the Gokaigers defeat him.
Hikari Sentai Maskman: The  is the Maskmen's mystical power source. Jolokia originally stole this Great Power off-screen until the Gokaigers defeat him. When channeled through GokaiOh, the Great Power allows the mecha to perform the  finisher.
Taiyo Sentai Sun Vulcan: An unseen Great Power that Jolokia originally stole off-screen until the Gokaigers defeat him.
Chikyu Sentai Fiveman: An unseen Great Power that Jolokia originally stole off-screen until the Gokaigers defeat him.
Kamen Rider OOO: An unseen Great Power that appears exclusively in the crossover film Kamen Rider × Super Sentai: Super Hero Taisen.
Tokumei Sentai Go-Busters: The bond between the Go-Busters and their Buddyloid partners. This Great Power appears exclusively in the crossover film Tokumei Sentai Go-Busters vs. Kaizoku Sentai Gokaiger: The Movie.

Greatest Treasure in the Universe
The  is a small golden pyramid-shaped object hidden in the center of the Earth, which the  can speak through. It is capable of freely changing the universe in any way the user wishes, at the cost of every Super Sentai team's existence. While the Gokaigers initially seek out its power to remove the Zangyack from existence, they become conflicted upon learning of its cost and eventually destroy the treasure, opting to confront the Zangyack Empire with their own strength.

Giant robots
: The  of the Gokai Machines that possesses incredible agility and wields the twin  swords and the built-in  chest cannon. Additionally, GokaiOh can wield other weapons like the  baseball bat and can perform the  finisher via the Gokai Hō and the  finisher via the Gokai Ken. The Gokaigers can also combine GokaiOh with some of the Great Powers to achieve stronger forms, which are as follows:
: The combination of GokaiOh and Magi Dragon that grants flight capabilities.
: The combination of GokaiOh and Pat Striker that grants increased firepower and the use of Pat Striker's parts as handguns.
: The combination of GokaiOh and Gao Lion that grants the use of the latter's abilities.
: The combination of GokaiOh and the Variblune that also grants flight capabilities. Goren GokaiOh first appears in the film Gokaiger Goseiger Super Sentai 199 Hero Great Battle.
: The combination of GokaiOh and GouZyuJin that grants the use of the latter's arm weapons.
: Gai Ikari's personal giant robot that combines the Timerangers, Zyurangers, and Abarangers' Great Powers. In this form, GouZyuJin can perform the  finisher. Additionally, Ikari can combine GouZyuJin with some of the Great Powers to achieve stronger forms, which are as follows:
: The combination of GouZyuJin and the Mega Wing that grants flight capabilities and perform the  finisher.
During the events of the film Kaizoku Sentai Gokaiger vs. Space Sheriff Gavan: The Movie, Kanzen GokaiOh can perform the  alongside Gavan's Electronic Starbeast Dol.

Recurring characters

Zangyack
The  are a race of aliens who have conquered and destroyed untold numbers of planets across the galaxy and plan to invade Earth for their emperor, Akudos Gill. They initially see the Gokaigers as a minor nuisance until the pirates kill Warz, forcing Zangyack to make stopping the pirates a top priority and Akudos to come and oversee invasion personally. Ultimately, the Gokaigers destroy a majority of the Zangyack fleet and kill Akudos, dissolving the empire and bringing their reign to an end.

During the events of the crossover film Kamen Rider × Super Sentai: Super Hero Taisen, an alliance of the Sentai teams' revived enemies and Zangyack's remnants form  and join forces with Dai-Shocker to manipulate the Super Sentai and Kamen Riders into destroying each other. After the heroes fight back, Dai-Zangyack and Dai-Shocker combine their respective headquarters, the Gigant Horse and Crisis Fortress, to form the  mecha to destroy them, only for the heroes to defeat them and destroy the Big Machine with Rocket Drill Go-BusterOh.

Gill Family

Akudos Gill
 is the fierce kraken-themed leader of the Zangyack Empire, father of Warz Gill, and uncle of Bacchus Gill. After the first 34 Super Sentai teams sacrifice their powers to thwart Zangyack's first invasion of Earth, Akudos sends Warz with a second invasion force to take advantage of this as well as Damaras to oversee his son. When the Gokaigers kill Wars and Damaras however, Akudos comes to Earth with the entire Zangyack fleet, assumes command of the invasion, and focuses his full attention on the Gokaigers. Once Insarn weakens them, Akudos sends his fleet to Earth to execute a planetary genocide and kill the pirates, but Captain Marvelous and Gai Ikari narrowly destroy the fleet. Akudos battles the Gokaigers himself, though they eventually kill him.

During the events of the crossover film Kamen Rider × Super Sentai: Super Hero Taisen, Akudos is revived to serve in Dai-Zangyack. After being enlarged by the Gigant Horse, he fights Go-BusterOh alongside Wars until they are both killed by the Big Machine.

Warz Gill
 is the hotheaded, inept, petty, and paranoid swash-themed field commander of the Zangyack invasion forces and the son of Akudos Gill, whom Warz is desperate to prove himself to. In pursuit of this goal however, he comes off as hysterical, lashing out at the Gormin when his missions end in failures. Warz especially shows anger towards Damaras, whom he knows Akudos sent to watch over him. Despite eventually learning of the Gokaigers' quest for the Greatest Treasure in the Universe, Warz initially sees little point in focusing on them. After coming to Earth and being indirectly wounded by Captain Marvelous however, Warz vows to kill the Gokaigers with extreme prejudice. Upon receiving the  war machine, Warz attacks Earth and overpowers the Gokaigers in battle before sending Barizorg to finish them off. Following Barizorg's death however, Warz defies Damaras' concerns and returns to Earth to seek revenge, only to be killed by the Gokaigers via Kanzen GokaiOh.

During the events of the crossover film Kamen Rider × Super Sentai: Super Hero Taisen, Warz is revived to serve in Dai-Zangyack. After being enlarged by the Gigant Horse, he fights Go-BusterOh alongside Akudos until they are both killed by the Big Machine.

The Great Warz is a giant robot that possesses incredible agility and wields the arm-mounted .

Damaras
 is an armored robot known in the Zangyack Empire as their  and the  due to his skills as a general, strategist, and warrior. He is ordered by Akudos Gill to accompany the latter's son, Warz Gill, and assist him as his second in command. Due to Warz's personality, Damaras questions his decisions and expresses curiosity in the Gokaigers' reasons for being on Earth. To this end, he sends the Sneak Brothers to infiltrate the Gokai Galleon and learn the pirates' intentions before hiring Basco Ta Jolokia to eliminate the pirates. However, Damaras' efforts to convince Warz to prioritize crippling the Gokaigers' chances of earning Great Powers are hindered by Warz's single-minded focus on Zangyack's invasion of Earth. After the Gokaigers kill Warz, Damaras vows vengeance, but allows Akudos to relieve him of his position and send him to the brig out of shame despite being able to easily escape. Nonetheless, Akudos gives Damaras a chance to redeem himself if he executes the Gokaigers personally. The latter forces Jolokia to help him overpower the Gokaigers while he captures Captain Marvelous, but a combination of Don Dogoier's successful rescue attempt and Jolokia's treachery leaves Damaras wounded before his rematch against the Gokaigers. Damaras enlarges, but is killed by Kanzen GokaiOh.

Insarn
 is a thermography-themed alien and Zangyack's mad scientist who supplies their Action Commanders with powerful weapons and modifications and desires to make a name for herself as the greatest scientific mind in the universe. She is also charged with enlarging Action Commanders via the Gigant Horses enlargement cannons and a gun-shaped controller and rarely leaves the flagship.

Insarn wields the  tool that doubles as a whip and the  pauldrons that can fire poison missiles. The Great Insarn, meanwhile, possesses a force field and the ability to perform the  attack.

Barizorg
 is a cyborg who is completely loyal to Warz Gill and hardly speaks unless the situation calls for it. He was originally , a senior officer and Joe Gibken's comrade in the Zangyack Imperial Special Forces. However, the former committed treason while freeing the imprisoned Gibken and sacrificed himself covering his friend's escape. Following this, Bamick was forcibly converted into a cyborg by Zangyack scientist Zaien and had most of his memories erased save for his swordsmanship. While Barizorg eventually learns what happened to him, his programming makes him ignore the information. After Warz uses the Great Warz to overpower the Gokaigers, he sends Barizorg to finish them off. The latter encounters and faces Gibken in battle, during which he is killed, freeing Bamick's soul.

Before he was converted into Barizorg, Bamick was an expert swordsman who can perform the  attack, which Barizorg retains following his conversion.

Dairando
 is an arrogant, fun-loving, stonefish-themed alien and a member of the Zangyack Imperial Guard who accompanies Akudos Gill to the Gigant Horse, becoming the latter's second-in-command. After the Gokaigers kill Insarn, Dairando leads the Zangyack armada in attacking the weakened pirates before fighting them personally. Despite initially having the upper hand, he becomes distracted by Captain Marvelous and Gai Ikari destroying the armada before the other Gokaigers kill Dairando.

Foot soldiers
: Zangyack's robotic foot soldiers armed with weapons provided by Insarn who are typically dropped from Zangyack ships through chandelier-like devices that magnetically hold them by their flat, metallic heads.
: Zangyack officers armed with beam cannons who lead the Gormin into battle and support the Action Commanders. They can transform into jet fighter configurations capable of linking up into a hovercraft for an Action Commander to ride on and reconfigure their lower bodies into motorcycle-like forms.
: Akudos Gill's red bodyguards armed with spears and fireball cannons who are always seen in pairs and wield polearms that form the Zangyack insignia.

Action Commanders
The  are aliens who serve under Zangyack. Many receive modifications from Insarn to enhance their natural talents while some are connected to or successors of past Sentai villains.

: A lamprey-themed alien who attacks civilians until he is killed by the Gokaigers.
: An octopus-themed alien who is sent to lead a second attack wave. After being defeated by the Gokaigers, an enlarged Bongan is killed by GokaiOh.
: A coral-themed alien with mechanical tentacles. Originally sent to Earth in order to cause massive eruptions, he deviates from his mission to kill the Gokaigers. After being defeated by them, an enlarged Salamandam is killed by Magi GokaiOh.
: An alien swordsman who believes in winning by any means, having Insarn modify his body with bladed tendrils in response to learning about Gokai Blue's two-blade fighting style. After being defeated by Gokai Blue via his newly developed five-blade Style, an enlarged Zodomas is killed by Magi GokaiOh.
: A brain coral-themed Alienizer from Planet Trigger who is wanted by SPD for multiple counts of planetary terrorism. A master of gun-based combat via his two handguns, he works with the Zangyack Empire in a plot to use subterranean missiles to destroy every city on Earth. After his plan is thwarted and he is defeated by the Gokaigers, an enlarged Buramudo is killed by Deka GokaiOh.
: A lingula-themed alien who can turn invisible and bypass any security system. He is sent to obtain a tree that bears gold so the Zangyack Empire can have unlimited funding. However, Nanonanoda accidentally destroys the tree in a fire he caused before he is defeated by the Gokaigers. After being enlarged, he is hurled into space and killed by Deka GokaiOh.
: The Incan-themed son of Pachacamac XII and successor to the  fighting style. Originally, he could perform the  attack, but Insarn modifies him so he can perform the  attack. After being defeated by the Gokaigers, an enlarged Pachacamac XIII is killed by GokaiOh.
: An elite spy duo composed of the humanoid turtle-themed  and his sea urchin-themed, orb-like older brother . They are sent by Damaras to spy on the Gokaigers, but Elder is swatted into outer space by GokaiOh while Younger is killed by Deka GokaiOh. In the film Kaizoku Sentai Gokaiger vs. Space Sheriff Gavan: The Movie, Elder returns to seek revenge along with his humanoid younger sister, . Using the power of Makuu Space to create clones of himself that can combine into a giant ball, Elder and Sister battle Gokai Yellow and Green in Makuu City until they are killed during the destruction of the Makuu Prison.
: A spider crab/dog-themed alien with superhuman speed and a cybernetic claw for a left hand. He is sent by Damaras to take the treasure on the Animarium before the Gokaigers can find it. However, after the Action Commander is knocked off the island, Warz Gill changes Bauza's objective to conquering a city. After being defeated by the Gokaigers, an enlarged Bauza is killed by Gao GokaiOh.
: The barnacle-themed leader of Zangyack's "Special Destruction Unit" and a gambler who wields a deck of exploding cards and utilizes the alien element, Gigarollum, to destroy planets that prove troublesome. After being defeated by the Gokaigers however, an enlarged Yokubarido is killed by Gao GokaiOh.
He is sent to retrieve a deadly metal called . After the Gokaigers defeat him, an enlarged Zaggai is killed by Shinken GokaiOh.
After Warz Gill has Insarn secretly modify his collar to turn him into a suicide bomber, Arumadon is sent to plant a bomb in a major city before the Gokaigers find and disarm it. After the pirates find his collar's weak spot, they almost set off its bomb until Gokai Silver realizes Warz's plan, hacks the collar, and safely removes the bomb before killing Arumadon.
: A horseshoe crab/rhinoceros-themed alien who is assigned by Damaras to set up a beachhead for the Zangyack Empire's invasion. After being foiled and defeated by Gokai Silver, an enlarged Osogain is killed by GouZyuJin.
: A piranha/skeleton-themed alien who is deployed to render humans too impassive to resist Zangyack's invasion. After being defeated by Gokai Silver, an enlarged Worian is killed by GouZyuJin.
: A starfish-themed alien who is deployed to find two Power Stones and siphon their energy to summon a large meteor to crash into Earth. After being enlarged by Warz Gill before the Gokaigers can defeat him, Stargull is killed by Shinken GokaiOh while the meteor is deflected by GouZyuJin.
After being defeated by the Gokaigers, an enlarged Sen-Den is killed by Shinken GokaiOh and GouZyuJin.
: A shark-themed alien ninja and the son of Jakanja member, Sandaaru, who specializes in the  fighting style and possesses many of his father's skills. After using his , Sandaaru Jr. is killed by GouZyuJin and Fuuraimaru.
: A peacock/evil clown-themed alien ninja and the son of Jakanja member, Satarakura, who also specializes in Space Ninpou and possesses his father's skills. After being defeated by the Gokaigers and Hurricanegers, Satarakura Jr. enlarges himself before he is destroyed by Hurricane GokaiOh.
He is deployed to switch the minds of several world leaders with Zugormin to ensure Earth's nations unconditionally surrender to the Zangyack Empire. After the Gokaigers foil his plans however, he body-switches Gokai Yellow and Green, who eventually defeat him to reverse his effects. Regaeru is enlarged, only to be killed by Hurricane GokaiOh.
: An amoeba-themed alien who possesses a  that allows him to alter his size and wields the  staff capable of absorbing humans' happiness. Insarn tasks him with collecting happiness from newlywed brides to cure Warz Gill's cold. However, Gokai Pink tricks him into giving up his staff before the rest of the Gokaigers defeat him. Dial is enlarged, but is killed by GouZyu GokaiOh.
After Gokai Green develops the Gokai Galleon Buster, the Gokaigers use it to defeat Shieldon. He is enlarged, but is killed by Hurricane GokaiOh.
: A sea anemone-themed alien capable of eating anything put before him who is sent to reduce the world's food supply. After being defeated by the Gokaigers, an enlarged Zakyura is killed by Fuuraimaru.
: A hammerhead shark-themed alien capable of shapeshifting into anyone once he touches their forehead. Having kidnapped Gokai Yellow's friend, Cain, Vannine lures her into a trap and uses her form to infiltrate the Gokai Galleon. However, the other Gokaigers immediately recognize the monster's ruse and deceive him into leading them to their crewmate before defeating him. Vannine is enlarged, but is killed by Hurricane GokaiOh.
: An effeminate fairy-themed alien and an old friend of Dairando's who wields the  wand, which allows him to perform spells capable of turning people into dolls and back. After being defeated by the Gokaigers, an enlarged Bibabu is killed by Kanzen GokaiOh.
: A Bumba Meu Boi-themed alien nicknamed the  who wields a crystal capable of intensifying the darkness in humans' hearts to the point of madness. Insarn sends him to attack people, but the Gokaigers and Ninjaman foil and defeat him. After being enlarged, Juju is killed by Kanzen GokaiOh and Ninjaman.

Other Action Commanders
: An alien who is armed with the  force field. After being defeated by the Gokaigers, an enlarged Muchaburin is killed by GokaiOh.
: A crab-themed alien who accompanies Bacchus Gill, only to be killed by the Kyoryugers.

Imperial Guard
The  are Zangyack's elite soldiers who serve directly under Akudos Gill.

: The crab-themed leader of the Imperial Guard and a fearsome swordsman who is sent by Akudos Gill to help Warz Gill conquer Earth. After being defeated by the Gokaigers, an enlarged Deratsueiger is killed by Shinken GokaiOh.
After accompanying Akudos Gill to the Gigant Horse following Warz Gill's death, Zatsurig is deployed to kill the Gokaigers, only to be defeated by them. He is enlarged, but is killed by Kanzen GokaiOh.

Other members
: A jellyfish-themed Zangyack scientist who converted Sid Bamick into Barizorg. Visiting Warz Gill to check on Barizorg, Zaien agrees to help the prince capture physically fit humans for the prince's plan to mass-produce more Barizorg-like cyborgs. After the Gokaigers foil his plan and defeat him, an enlarged Zaien is killed by Hurricane GokaiOh and GouZyuJin.

Navi
Through these riddles, the Gokaigers encounter past Sentai heroes and important individuals or events. Upon acquiring all of the Sentai's Great Powers, the pirates discover Navi is the gate that leads to the Greatest Treasure. Following this, Navi assists the Gokaigers in defeating the Zangyack Empire before joining them on their continuing journeys.

Basco Ta Jolokia
 is an overconfident alien privateer who believes in discarding something of lesser value in order to gain something more valuable and is capable of assuming a human form. Jolokia accompanied the Red Pirates in collecting the Ranger Keys until he discovered their leader, Aka Red's, intention to use them to find the Greatest Treasure in the Universe. Following this, Jolokia betrays his comrades to the Zangyack Empire in an attempt to get the Greatest Treasure for himself. While Marvelous escapes with the Ranger Keys the Red Pirates had found up to that point, Jolokia finds 25 more after the fact.

Upon learning Marvelous is among them, Jolokia uses 15 of his Ranger Keys to kidnap the former's crew and ransom them for the latter's Ranger Keys. While the Gokaigers are able to escape his clutches and claim the Ranger Keys he used, Jolokia uses his remaining 10 in several attempts to steal the Great Powers before they can get to them. He succeeds in stealing those of the Flashmen, Maskmen, Changemen, Sun Vulcan team, and Fivemen, though the Gokaigers prevent him from stealing the Gingamen, GoGoFive team, and Ohrangers' Great Powers and take the last of his Ranger Keys. In retaliation, Jolokia uses his true form to overwhelm the Gokaigers before sparing them so that they can collect the remaining Great Powers for him.

Due to this, Damaras forces Jolokia to help him kill the Gokaigers to save face with Zangyack emperor, Akudos Gill. Nonetheless, Jolokia fakes the pirates' deaths before figuratively and literally stabbing Damaras in the back, severing ties with the Zangyack, who reinstate and increase the bounty they put on his head. After the Gokaigers collect the last Great Power and he loses the last of his Giant Battle Pseudo-Lifeforms, Jolokia willfully injures his pet space monkey, Sally, and secretly plants a bomb on her in the hopes that the Gokaigers will take pity on her, take her to the Gokai Galleon, and allow her to steal their Ranger Keys. While Sally has a change of heart and sides with the Gokaigers, Jolokia detonates her bomb in an attempt to kill Marvelous. While the blast kills Sally, Marvelous is left grievously injured. The remaining Gokaigers fight Jolokia to avenge their captain, but the privateer overpowers them once more and takes control of their Gokai Galleon so he can imbue the corresponding Ranger Keys with the Great Powers he stole. Before he can reach the Greatest Treasure however, the Gokaigers narrowly retake the Gokai Galleon, but fail to defeat Jolokia until Marvelous returns and faces his former friend in a final duel, during which Jolokia acknowledges Marvelous' determination and addresses him by his proper name. Eventually, Marvelous prevails, causing Jolokia to realize killing Sally was his undoing before he disappears in a cloud of red mist.

During the events of the film Uchu Sentai Kyuranger vs. Space Squad, Demost revives Jolokia, among other fallen Sentai villains, to help him in his plans. After the Kyurangers defeat Demost, Jolokia and the other revived villains are returned to the afterlife.

In both of his forms, Jolokia wields the  cutlass and the  gun. In his human form, he wields the  trumpet, which allows him to transform his Ranger Keys into physical constructs to serve him as well as forcibly steal Great Powers from past Sentai warriors and turn them into golden orbs.

Sally
 is Basco Ta Jolokia's pet space monkey who carries a pair of cymbals and serves as his bodyguard. Due to her ability to create Giant Battle Pseudo-Lifeforms from her stomach hatch, Jolokia protects her until she runs out of them. Hoping to take advantage of the Gokaigers' sympathy, he gives her a bomb disguised as a necklace before injuring her so the Gokaigers will take her in and allow her to steal their Ranger Keys. When the pirates treat her injuries and show her kindness however, a touched Sally attempts to leave Jolokia. However, the privateer reveals his plan and detonates her bomb in an attempt to kill Marvelous. At the last minute, Sally places the bomb in her hatch, sacrificing herself to take the brunt of the blast while Marvelous survives, albeit with grievous injuries.

Guest characters
: A young boy who possesses knowledge of the previous 34 Super Sentai and lost his grandfather during the Legend War. When the Gokaigers first arrived on Earth, Niwano recognizes they had no intention of protecting Earth and attempts to steal their Ranger Keys to do so himself, though he only succeeds in getting the Shinken Red Key. Despite desiring to get the Ranger Key back, Captain Marvelous chooses to test Niwano by giving him his Mobilate so the boy can use the Key to fight the Zangyack Empire himself. Niwano defeats a squad of Gormin, but is beaten by Action Commander, Bongan, before Marvelous takes his equipment back and tells Niwano to protect Earth another way while the latter tells him Earth is worth protecting. Niwano later encounters Marvelous while fighting Gormin using kendo training during Zangyack's final attempt to destroy Earth. Ten years later, during the events of Kaizoku Sentai: Ten Gokaiger, Niwano became a scientist who was recruited by Japan's Minister of Defense to help him collect the Ranger Keys and conquer the universe. When Marvelous works to stop the minister, Niwano reunites with the former and his crew and helps them foil the minister's plans.
While working for the Zangyack Empire as an Action Commander, he discovers Insarn has fallen in love with Kyousuke Jinnai. Harboring unrequited love for her, Jerashid comes to Earth to capture Jinnai, only to be defeated by the Gokaigers, suddenly enlarged by Warz Gill, and defeated by Shinken GokaiOh. Despite being shrunk back to his normal height and surviving the fight, Insarn has him thrown out with the Zangyack's trash. After ending up back on Earth with said trash, Jerashid finds his way to a takoyaki stand owned by a man named Nobuyuki and agrees to become his "pet", later apprentice, in exchange for food. However, Nobuyuki's mother vehemently opposes the idea until Jerashid takes an attack from Action Commander, Sen-Den, meant for her. Following this, Jerashid and Nobuyuki's mother elope and open a hot springs resort together. As of the film Kaizoku Sentai Gokaiger vs. Space Sheriff Gavan: The Movie, Jerashid was imprisoned in Zangyack's Makuu Prison until the Gokaigers free him and the other inmates.
: An alien reputed to be the strongest bounty hunter in the universe who believes that only money and battle truly matter in life. Sometime prior to the series, he encountered a young Captain Marvelous and nearly killed him, but intentionally scarred himself to create a weak point and make their rematch more interesting before letting Marvelous go. In the present, Kiaido is hired by Barizorg to eliminate the Gokaigers, but the bounty hunter instead attempts to increase the bounty on their heads and give them the chance to become stronger. With Gai Yuki's help, the Gokaigers eventually defeat and kill Kiaido.
: A race of giants produced by Sally who are based on the Seven Luminaries and named after a different element.
: A liquid/water-themed giant with a flexible body, extendable arms, and electrokinesis. It is destroyed by Shinken GokaiOh.
: A moon rock-themed giant with a rock-like body and the use of moon-themed attacks. It is destroyed by Shinken GokaiOh and GouZyuJin.
: A fire-themed giant capable of absorbing fire-based attacks to enhance its own. It is destroyed by GokaiOh and GouZyuJin.
: A soil-themed giant capable of trapping its opponents in large amounts of soil. It is destroyed by Kanzen GokaiOh.
: A wood/plant-themed giant that possesses the  arms, which it can stretch and entangle opponents with. It is destroyed by Kanzen GokaiOh.
: A gold-themed giant that can produce paralyzing gold dust. It is destroyed by Kanzen GokaiOh.
: A sun-themed giant able to shoot sun-like fireballs. It is destroyed by Kanzen GokaiOh.
: The new leader of the Gaiark Clan and the son of the group's previous leader, Pollution President Batcheed. However, the Gokaigers return and defeat Babatcheed and Zangyack's forces. After using his Industrial Revolution ability to enlarge himself, Babatcheed is destroyed by Go-on GokaiOh.
: A cowboy-themed, robotic denizen of Gunman World who is armed with various firearms, built-in missile launchers, and a lasso that can absorb the Engines' power. Having betrayed his homeworld to join the Gaiark Clan and became Babatcheed's right-hand man, Chirakashizky oversees their conquest of Gunman World until the Gokaigers arrive and defeat him. After using his newly-acquired Industrial Revolution ability to enlarge himself, Chirakashizky is destroyed by Hurricane GokaiOh.
: A scallop-themed Matroid of the Matrintis Empire. He is deployed to destroy the Negakure Shrine and obtain the power source inside it, but is defeated by the Gokaigers, enlarged by Metal Alice, and destroyed by GouZyuJin.

Returning characters

Spin-off exclusive characters
: The undead captain of a ghost ship that travels the cosmos and houses the spirits of various dead Sentai groups' enemies who appears exclusively in the film Kaizoku Sentai Gokaiger the Movie: The Flying Ghost Ship. Despite possessing a wish-granting relic called the God Eye, his ghostly form prevents him from using it to grant his wish to rule the universe. To remedy this, he preys on would-be thieves and has them killed in order to use their life force to live again. After, the Gokaigers foil Los Dark's scheme, he fights them in his mecha, which is armed with an eye-patch that can shoot laser beams, a large hook that can turn into a cannon, and a quintuple-barreled chest cannon. However, the Gokaigers destroy it, with the resulting explosion taking Los Dark and his ship with it.
: A gestalt entity created from the souls of the previous 34 Sentai groups' enemy factions' foot soldiers trapped in Los Dark's ship. They initially fight the Gokaigers individually before fusing together to increase their chances of success. Due to the foot soldiers' varying personalities and goals however, the Gokaigers take advantage by killing them via the Battle Fever team's powers.
: A blank, drone replica of Barizorg who appears exclusively in the Kodansha DVD Special Kaizoku Sentai Gokaiger: Let's Do This Goldenly! Roughly! The 36th Decree Gokai Change!!. Insarn creates him with the intention of fusing him with Gai Ikari and turning the latter into a Zangyack soldier in order to use his knowledge on the Gokaigers' Sentai predecessors. However, she inadvertently fuses Ikari with Captain Marvelous, damaging Karizorg in the process. After repairing him and briefly fusing him with a cat to ensure her fusion device works, Insarn fuses Karizorg with a Gormin to create  in order to defeat Ikari / Marvelous. However, the pirates transform into Gokai Red Gold Mode to defeat Zugozorg before stealing the fusion device to undo what happened to them.
: The giant clam-themed prison warden of Zangyack's prison, which is located in the otherworldly dimension of Makuu Space, and the heir to the legacy of Don Horror who bears a grudge against Gavan for his predecessor's demise and appears exclusively in the crossover film Kaizoku Sentai Gokaiger vs. Space Sheriff Gavan: The Movie. Ashurada attempts to take control of the Galactic Union Police via his  disguise and kill the Gokai Galleon crew, but Gavan plays into Ashurada's scheme to expose his identity. The latter retaliates by using his connection to Don Horror to torture Gavan and have Makuu Space consume the universe. However, the Gokaigers save Gavan and join forces with him to kill Ashurada.
: A robotic warrior built from a combination of Zangyack and Space Police technology to serve Ashurada and resemble Gavan who appears exclusively in the crossover film Kaizoku Sentai Gokaiger vs. Space Sheriff Gavan: The Movie. It is capable of replicating the original Gavan's abilities, can pull individuals into Makuu Space, and access the Makuu Prison's security system. It is destroyed by Gavan.
: The provisional commander of the Zangyack Empire and nephew of Akudos Gill who appears exclusively in the crossover film Tokumei Sentai Go-Busters vs. Kaizoku Sentai Gokaiger: The Movie. As the last living relative of the Gill family, Bacchus is bent on restoring the Zangyack Empire to its former glory. In pursuit of his goal, he forms an alliance with Vaglass to find the Phantom Ranger Keys and use their power. After enlarging himself however, he is killed by GokaiOh and Go-Buster LiOh.
: The giant kraken-themed embodiment of the deceased members of the Gill family who defeated the Gokaigers off-screen prior to the events of the crossover film Tokumei Sentai Go-Busters vs. Kaizoku Sentai Gokaiger: The Movie. In the Doubutsu Sentai Zyuohger episode "Champion of Champions", Bangray uses Gai Ikari's memories to create a construct of Gokudos to kill the Gokaigers and Zyuohgers. However, the Sentai teams destroy Gokudos with Wild Tousai King via the power of the Gokaigers' Ranger Keys.
: A group of alien pirates who destroyed 129 planets, can disguise themselves to suit their needs, and appear exclusively in the V-Cinema Kaizoku Sentai: Ten Gokaiger. To operate the public gambling ring, the pirates and minister order Gai Ikari and young scientist Masatoshi Niwano to borrow the Ranger Keys from the Super Sentai members and develop a machine capable of stealing Sentai powers respectively using Basco's Rapparatta as a medium.
: A leading member who is armed with a billhook-like sword. On Earth, he assumes the identity of  while posing as an aide to Japan's Minister of Defense. Badley is killed by Gokai Red.
: A female leading member who is capable of temporarily stopping a target's movement and wields a pair of sai. On Earth, she assumes the identity of  while posing as an aide to Japan's Minister of Defense. Rem is killed by Gokai Yellow and Pink.
: A leading member with brute strength who is armed with a kanabō. On Earth, he assumes the identity of  while posing as an aide to Japan's Minister of Defense. Agdaros is killed by Gokai Green and Silver.

Notes

References

Super Sentai characters
Kaizoku Sentai Gokaiger
Kaizoku Sentai Gokaiger